Empress Yan is the name of:

Empress Yan Ji (died 126), Han dynasty empress
Empress Yan (Li Qi's wife) ( 334), Cheng Han empress, married to Li Qi
Empress Yan (Li Shou's wife) ( 338–343), Cheng Han empress, married to Li Shou

Yan